The blue-throated barbet (Psilopogon asiaticus) is an Asian barbet native to the foothills of the Himalayas and Southeast Asia.
It has bright green, blue and red plumage. The barbets get their name from the bristles which fringe their heavy bills; this species eats fruits and insects.

References

External links 

 

blue-throated barbet
Birds of Bangladesh
Birds of the Himalayas
Birds of Northeast India
Birds of Southeast Asia
Birds of Yunnan
blue-throated barbet
Birds of Myanmar